La Rosière de Salency is a three-act comedy, mingled with ariettes, by Charles-Simon Favart, music by Blaise, Philidor, Monsigny and Duni. It was presented at Château de Fontainebleau 25 October 1769 and at Comédie-Italienne 14 December.

On 18 January 1774, André Grétry had a new version of La Rosière presented at Fontainebleau, with a libretto reworked by marquis de Pezay.

External links 
 Toutes les représentations sur le site CÉSAR
 Libretto online

French plays
1769 plays
Opéras comiques
Operas
Operas by André Grétry
Operas by Egidio Duni